Felice de Giardini (12 April 1716 – 8 June 1796) was an Italian composer and violinist.

Early life
Felice Giardini was born in Turin. When it became clear that he was a child prodigy, his father sent him to Milan. There he studied singing, harpsichord and violin but it was on the latter that he became a famous virtuoso. By the age of 12, he was already playing in theatre orchestras. In a famous incident about this time, Giardini, who was serving as assistant concertmaster (i.e. leader of the orchestra) during an opera, played a solo passage for violin which the composer Niccolò Jommelli had written. He decided to show off his skills and improvised several bravura variations which Jommelli had not written. Although the audience applauded loudly, Jommelli, who happened to be there, was not pleased and suddenly stood up and slapped the young man in the face. Giardini, years later, remarked, "it was the most instructive lesson I ever received from a great artist."

In London
During the 1750s, Giardini toured Europe as a violinist, scoring successes in Paris, Berlin, and especially in England, where he eventually settled. For many years, he served as the orchestra leader and director of the Italian Opera in London and gave solo concerts under the auspices of J. C. Bach with whom he was a close friend. He directed the orchestra at the London Pantheon. From the mid-1750s to the end of the 1760s, he was widely regarded as the greatest musical performing artist before the public. His identity with the Signor Giardini, who in 1774 sought with Dr Charles Burney to form a public music school associated with the Foundling Hospital is uncertain. In 1784, he returned to Naples to run a theatre, but encountered financial setbacks. In 1793, he returned to England to try his luck. But times had changed, and he was no longer remembered. He then went to Russia, but again had little luck, dying in Moscow in 1796.

Compositions
Giardini was a prolific composer, writing for virtually every genre which then existed. His two main areas, however, were opera and chamber music. Virtually all of his music is out of print with the exception of a few songs and works of chamber music. As a string player, he knew how to make string instruments sound their best. His chamber music combines the so-called Style Galant with the mid-18th-century classicism of J.C. Bach, the Stamitzes and the Mannheim school. In the Style Galant, the writing emphasises the soloistic qualities of the instruments, rather than integrated part-writing, to create a whole. Giardini, although he did write string quartets and quartets for other instruments – a new and evolving form at the time – concentrated on writing trios, primarily those for violin, viola and cello, of which he wrote at least 18.

Giardini is known among Protestant churches for his "Italian Hymn" or "Moscow", which often accompanies the text to the hymn "Come, Thou Almighty King" and also John Marriott's hymn "Thou whose almighty word". It is the tune for "Glory to God on High", which is in the Latter-day Saint hymnal.

Family
He married Maria Caterina Violante Vistris, a minor Italian singer, in August 1753 in Bramham. Both parties listed their residence at the time as Bramham Park, near Leeds; Bramham was a seat of George Fox-Lane, later created Baron Bingley. His wife Harriet was Giardini's most consistent patron.

References

 The New Grove Dictionary of Music & Musicians, Ed. Stanley Sadie, London: Macmillan 1980. .
 Some of the information on this page appears on the website of Edition Silvertrust but permission has been granted to copy, distribute and/or modify this document under the terms of the GNU Free Documentation License.

External links
 Felice Giardini String Trios sound-bites and short biography
 
 
Free scores at the Mutopia Project
Felice Giardini (Person page at www.hymnary.org) with i.a. references to over 170 hymnals containing his compositions

1716 births
1796 deaths
Italian emigrants to the Kingdom of Great Britain
Italian British musicians
Italian male classical composers
Italian violinists
Male violinists
English people of Italian descent
People from the Kingdom of Sardinia
Italian opera composers
Male opera composers
18th-century Italian composers
18th-century Italian male musicians
18th-century violinists